Kassita (Tarifit: Kasita, ⴽⴰⵙⵉⵜⴰ; Arabic: كاسيطا) is a small town in the Driouch Province in northeastern Morocco, in the Oriental administrative region. According to the 2004 census, it has a population of 2,126.

References

Populated places in Oriental (Morocco)